Stefano Zacchiroli is an Italian and French academic and computer scientist who lives and works in Paris, and a former Debian Project Leader.

Debian involvement
Zacchiroli became a Debian Developer in 2001. After attending LinuxTag in 2004, he became more involved in the Debian community and the project itself, eventually being elected as DPL in 2010, succeeding Steve McIntyre, a position in which he served from April 2010 to April 2013. In April 2011, he was re-elected unopposed as project leader.  He was himself succeeded by Lucas Nussbaum in an election where he himself was no longer a candidate.

Free and Open Source Career
In 2015, O'Reilly presented an open source award to Zacchiroli.

In 2016, Zacchiroli founded the Software Heritage project together with Roberto Di Cosmo.

He was a director of the Open Source Initiative from 2014 to 2017 and is currently a member of Free Software Foundation's High Priority Projects committee.

References

External links
 Zacchiroli's home page
 2010 DPL campaign platform
 How Debian has grown: Stefano Zacchiroli speaks, iTWire, May 2012
 Keeping 1000 devs focused: new Debian leader speaks, iTWire, April 2010

Debian Project leaders
Italian computer programmers
Italian computer scientists
French computer programmers
French computer scientists
Living people
Free software programmers
1979 births
Members of the Open Source Initiative board of directors